Jean Mermet (born 22 January 1932) was a French cross-country skier who competed in the 1950s. Competing in three Winter Olympics in the 4 x 10 km relay, his best finish was fourth at Oslo in 1952.

References
Wallechinsky, David. (1984). The Complete Book of the Olympics: 1896-1980. "4x10-kilometer relay". New York: Penguin Books. pp. 617–618.

External links
French NOC 1952 Winter Olympics results 
French NOC 1956 Winter Olympics results 
French NOC 1960 Winter Olympics results 

Olympic cross-country skiers of France
Cross-country skiers at the 1952 Winter Olympics
Cross-country skiers at the 1956 Winter Olympics
Cross-country skiers at the 1960 Winter Olympics
French male cross-country skiers
Living people
1932 births
20th-century French people